Christopher M. Pietruszkiewicz is an American college administrator and currently the president of the University of Evansville in Evansville, Indiana. Prior to becoming president of the University of Evansville, Pietruszkiewicz served as dean of Stetson University College of Law.

Career 
Prior to entering academia, Pietruszkiewicz served as a trial attorney in the United States Department of Justice Tax Division from 1997 to 2001, receiving the Outstanding Attorney Award in 2000. He also served as an attorney and adviser in the United States Department of Education from 1992 to 1997, receiving the Assistant Secretary’s Award for Team Distinction and the Deputy Secretary’s Award for Service.

Pietruszkiewicz began his academic career at the George Mason University School of Law, where he was an adjunct professor. He joined the faculty of Louisiana State University Paul M. Hebert Law Center in 2001, and became vice chancellor for business and financial affairs in 2007.

In 2018, he was named president of the University of Evansville in Evansville, Indiana.

Controversies curing presidency of University of Evansville 

On May 17, 2019, the University of Evansville made what members of the Evansville community claimed to be a controversial decision to sell the students' station WUEV to WAY-FM, a non-profit nationwide network that plays contemporary Christian music. Pietruszkiewicz was said to have refused to meet with UE students who objected to the sale.

In 2020, the faculty of the university voted "no confidence" in Pietruszkiewicz amid a study of the university's future. Later that year, during the COVID-19 pandemic, Pietruszkiewicz and the university board of trustees threatened to eliminate 3 departments and 17 majors due to proposed cuts. This was protested heavily and most majors were kept.

References

Living people
University of Evansville people
Year of birth missing (living people)